Kesse may refer to:

People 

 Kesse (musician) (born 1986), Ghanaian musician
 Jennifer Kesse (born 1981), American woman who disappeared in 2006
 Yona Kesse (19071985), Israeli politician

Other uses 

 a common name of the herb Lippia abyssinica
 Kesse, Estonia, a village